
Gmina Parczew is an urban-rural gmina (administrative district) in Parczew County, Lublin Voivodeship, in eastern Poland.

Neighbouring gminas
Gmina Parczew is bordered by the gminas of Dębowa Kłoda, Jabłoń, Milanów, Niedźwiada, Ostrów Lubelski, Siemień and Uścimów.

Villages
The gmina contains the following villages having the status of sołectwo: Babianka, Brudno, Buradów, Jasionka, Koczergi, Komarne, Królewski Dwór, Laski, Michałówka, Pohulanka, Przewłoka, Siedliki, Sowin, Tyśmienica, Wierzbówka, Wola Przewłocka and Zaniówka.

References

Polish official population figures 2006

Parczew
Parczew County